The 1956 United States presidential election in Texas took place on November 6, 1956, as part of the 1956 United States presidential election. Incumbent President Eisenhower won his birth state of Texas with 55% of the vote, giving him 24 electoral votes. Despite Eisenhower becoming the first Republican to win Texas by double digits, this result nonetheless made Texas  4.12% more Democratic than the nation-at-large.  

Eisenhower became the first Republican to carry Texas twice, having won the state in 1952 as well.

Results

Results by county

See also
 United States presidential elections in Texas

Notes

References

1956 Texas elections
1956
Texas